The second 1961 Major League Baseball All-Star Game was played in Fenway Park in Boston on July 31, 1961. It was the first MLB All-Star Game to end in a tie. The game in 2002 also ended in a tie.

Rocky Colavito's one-out home run in the bottom of the first off National League starter Bob Purkey gave the American League a 1–0 lead, but Purkey only allowed two walks in the second before Art Mahaffey pitched a scoreless third and fourth, allowing only a leadoff walk to Mickey Mantle in the fourth. The Americans only got three more hits versus Sandy Koufax and Stu Miller.

American starter Jim Bunning pitched three perfect innings, but Don Schwall allowed a bases-loaded single to Bill White that tied the game in the sixth. All five hits the Nationals got were charged to Schwall. Camilo Pascual pitched three shutout innings before the game was called due to rain after nine innings with the score 1–1.

Rosters
Players in italics have since been inducted into the National Baseball Hall of Fame.

National League

American League

Game

Umpires: Larry Napp, Home Plate (AL); Frank Secory, First Base (NL); Red Flaherty, Second Base (AL);  Ed Sudol, Third Base (NL); Al Smith, Left Field (AL); Chris Pelekoudas, Right Field (NL)

Starting lineups

Game Summary

Sources

References

External links
 Official program via Wayback Machine

Major League Baseball All-Star Game
Major League Baseball All-Star Game
Major League Baseball All-Star Game
Baseball competitions in Boston
Major League Baseball All-Star Game
1960s in Boston